John Roberts Jr. (15 August 1847 – 23 December 1919) was a dominant English professional player of English billiards. He was also a notable manufacturer of billiards cues and tables, and promoter of the sport.

Early years
Roberts Jr. lived in the shadow of his father, John Roberts Sr., for many years, but came into the public eye after his father's retirement, beating Willam Cook 1,200–722.  However, Cook would eventually gain superiority over John Roberts Jr.

In 1875, Cook was defeated by Roberts Jr. again and it sparked his dominance of the sport. In 1880, he left for Calcutta, where he set up a billiard table factory. Roberts however was able to concede starts to all opposition, but would not play in Championship matches. This damaged the sport's perception, as everybody perceived him to be champion. 

As two variants of the sport, "spot-barred" and "all-in" developed, Roberts came back to the fore, competing in only the "spot-barred" version. In 1884, he broke the spot-barred record break from 309 by Cook, to 360.

In 1885, Roberts sat at the meeting that formed the Billiards Association, and helped to code a new set of rules for the game of English billiards. Roberts challenged Cook for the title, which he won by default, but then he successfully defended the rematch from Cook to win the title.

Championship rift
William Peall beat Roberts in a match where he was restricted to 100 spots in a break. Peall was the leading "all-in" player in the era. Roberts maintained his spot-barred supremacy, and did not challenge either Peall or Billy Mitchell for the championship. He cited that the public would not enjoy the repetition of the game, a foreshadowing of the eventual decline of the game.

Peall and Roberts both claimed to be champions of the sport, and a match to test their claims proved unnegotiable. After a four-year hiatus, the championship returned when the Billiards Association decided to create two championships, one for all-in, and another for spot-barred. By this stage, Roberts was a successful billiards merchandise producer, and offered the association a venue, table and trophy for the new championship, but refused to play in it.

Roberts went on a tour of North America in 1894, playing the American champion, Frank Ives in Chicago. A return match held in New York City saw Ives again as champion.

Later that year, Roberts set his highest ever break in an exhibition at the Egyptian Hall in Piccadilly. His 867 included many  . He pioneered pneumatic (air-filled) rubber cushions in 1895 on his tables, in a bid to make them the best on the market, but this did not succeed. (vulcanized rubber cushioned had been in use since the 1850s, and remain among the most common today, along with cushions made of synthetic compounds.)

After a controversy regarding rules with the Billiards Association, Roberts won against Charles Dawson by 1,814 points, in a match lasting over two weeks. He again did not play in the championship in 1899.

Playing for royalty
Roberts had now involved himself in royal circles. He played Lily Langtry, a music personality of the day, and the Prince of Wales called Roberts shot against her  in a 50-up match. Roberts was still able to win the game.

He toured India and knowing that the Maharajah of Jaipur was a fan, he travelled to meet him. He ended up with an annual salary of UK£500, and expenses paid for any future visits to India. Despite potential transportation difficulties, the Maharajah organised a tournament. The players all went to India, and in the opening match, Roberts was potting the red repeatedly when the Maharajah ended the game declaring the winner to be Roberts. His opponent, S. W. Stanley, had played only one shot, an unsuccessful .

Roberts's determination to play the game also endeared him to many fans. He played Mitchell in Manchester, and despite having malarial fever and ague, he still made a 600 unfinished break to win the match.

Other tours
He made many tours of Australia and New Zealand, in 1876 playing a series of matches against South Australian champion Herman A. Albers; other opponents included theatre manager Samuel Lazar.
In 1900, he played several exhibition matches with playing partner Billy Weston (1847–1935), an Australasian champion.
In 1910, during another tour to Australia, Roberts played James Joynton Smith (later Sir Joynton and Lord Mayor of Sydney) at Smith’s Arcadia Hotel in Sydney.

In legal history
Roberts was the plaintiff in Roberts v. Gray, an important case in English law concerning the capacity of minors to conclude contracts.

References

1847 births
1919 deaths
Cue sports equipment manufacturers
Welsh players of English billiards
Place of birth missing
Place of death missing
World champions in English billiards